Fortuna Elementary School District  is a public school district based in Humboldt County, California, United States, created from the consolidation of Rohnerville and Fortuna Union Elementary School Districts effective July 1, 2012.

References

External links
 
 Humboldt County Office of Education

School districts in Humboldt County, California
2012 establishments in California
School districts established in 2012